The Molacima is a mountain of the Serra del Montsià range, Catalonia, Spain. It has an elevation of 748 metres above sea level.

The Molacima, with its triangular profile, looks like the highest peak from many angles around Ulldecona, along the Autopista AP-7 between Barcelona and Valencia. The true highest summit of the range is, however, the less conspicuous La Torreta.

See also
Serra del Montsià
Mountains of Catalonia

References

Mountains of Catalonia